Pranjal Bharali ( – 18 February 2020) was an Indian businessman and film producer from Assam. He produced Assamese films.

Biography
Besides film producing Bharali was involved in the construction business. He produced films like Antaheen Jatra, Maa Tumi Ononya, 
Suren Suror Putek and
Junda Iman Gunda.

Bharali died on 18 February 2020 at Nemcare Hospital in Guwahati at the age of 60.

Selected filmography
 Antaheen Jatra (2004)
 Maa Tumi Ononya (2004)
 Suren Suror Putek (2005)
 Junda Iman Gunda (2007)

References

1960 births
2020 deaths
Assamese film producers
Businesspeople from Guwahati